The hellbender (Cryptobranchus alleganiensis), also known as the hellbender salamander, is a species of giant salamander that is native to eastern North America.

Hellbender or Hellbenders may also refer to:

 Hellbender (video game), a 1996 futuristic flight simulator
 Hellbenders (film), a 2012 American comedy horror film
 Hellbender (film), a 2021 horror film
 Hellbenders, a 2012 animated web-series
 The Hellbenders (I crudeli, 1967), a spaghetti western directed by Sergio Corbucci